Eliane Elias   is a Brazilian jazz pianist, singer, composer and arranger.

Biography
Elias was born in São Paulo, Brazil on 19 March 1960. She started studying piano when she was seven, and at age twelve she was transcribing solos from jazz musicians. She began teaching piano when she was fifteen, and began performing at seventeen with Brazilian singer-songwriter Toquinho and touring with the poet Vinicius de Moraes.

In 1981 she moved to New York City, where she attended The Juilliard School of Music. A year later she became part of the group Steps Ahead. In 1993 Elias signed with EMI Classics to record classical pieces, which were released on On the Classical Side.

In 2001, Calle 54, a documentary film by Spanish director Fernando Trueba, included Elias performing "Samba Triste." In 2002 she recorded The Lost Days with Denyce Graves, for whom she wrote a composition entitled "HaabiaTupi." In 2002, Elias signed with RCA/Bluebird, which issued Kissed by Nature. Dreamer was released in 2004 and received the Gold Disc Award, as well as being voted Best Vocal Album in Japan. It reached No. 3 on the pop charts in France and No. 4 on the Billboard magazine charts in the U.S. Around the City was released by RCA Victor in August 2006. In 2007, Elias released Something for You, which won Best Vocal Album of the Year and the Gold Disc Award in Japan.  Something for You reached No. 1 on the U.S. jazz charts, No. 8 on Billboard, and No. 2 on the French jazz charts. In 2008, she recorded Bossa Nova Stories to celebrate the 50th anniversary of bossa nova.

In 2009, EMI Japan released Eliane Elias Plays Live. Light My Fire, released in 2011, features four compositions written or co-written by Elias and includes covers of songs by the Doors, Stevie Wonder, and Paul Desmond. In September 2011, her song "What About the Heart (Bate Bate)" was nominated for a Latin Grammy in the category of Best Brazilian Song. In 2012 she collaborated with bassist Marc Johnson on the album Swept Away, the Editor's and Critic's choice in 2012 Downbeat and Jazztimes magazines, respectively. Her 2013 release, I Thought About You, reached No. 1 on the U.S. and French Amazon.com websites; No. 2 on iTunes U.S., France and Brazil; and No. 4 on Billboard.

Made in Brazil, was followed by Dance of Time, which debuted at No. 1 on two Billboard: jazz and world music. Both Made in Brazil and Dance of Time debuted at No. 1 on iTunes in seven countries and won Grammy awards for Best Latin Jazz Album of the Year.

Her 2019 album Love Stories reached the #1 position as Best Seller Amazon.com Latin Jazz, #1 Best Seller Amazon.com Brazilian Jazz and #2 Best Seller Amazon.com Orchestral.

Her 2021 album Mirror, Mirror, which she recorded with Chick Corea and Chucho Valdès, won the Grammy Award for Best Latin Jazz Album.

Personal life
Elias is Brazilian of Italian and Spanish descent. She was married to American trumpeter Randy Brecker, with whom she has a daughter, the singer/songwriter Amanda Elias Brecker, born in 1984. She married Marc Johnson in 1999, who plays bass in her band and co-produces her recordings.

Awards
 1995: Grammy nomination, Best Jazz Solo Performance, Solos and Duets with Herbie Hancock
 1997: Best Jazz Album, DownBeat magazine Readers' Poll, The Three Americas
 1998: Grammy nomination, Best Large Jazz Ensemble, Impulsive with Bob Brookmeyer and The Danish Radio Jazz Orchestra
 2002: Grammy nomination, Best Latin Jazz Album, Calle 54
 2011: Latin Grammy nomination, Best Brazilian Song, What About the Heart (Bate Bate)
 2015: Latin Grammy nomination for Best Engineered Album, Made in Brazil
 2016: Grammy Award winner for Best Latin Jazz Album, Made in Brazil
 2017: Latin Grammy nomination for Best Engineered Album, Dance of Time
  2017: Latin Grammy Award winner for Best Latin Jazz/Jazz Album, Dance of Time
2018: Winner of the Edison Lifetime Achievement Award (Holland)
Five times Gold Disc Awards (Japan)
 2019 Masterpiece award "Love Stories" (5 stars by "DownBeat" magazine)
 2021 Masterpiece award "Mirror Mirror" (5 stars by "DownBeat" magazine)
 2022: Grammy Award winner for Best Latin Jazz Album, Mirror Mirror
 2022: Latin Grammy Award winner for Best Latin Jazz/Jazz Album, "Mirror Mirror"

Discography

As leader 
 Amanda with Randy Brecker (Passport Jazz, 1985)
 Illusions (Denon, 1986)
 Cross Currents (Denon, 1987)
 So Far So Close (Blue Note, 1989)
 Eliane Elias Plays Jobim (Blue Note, 1990)
 A Long Story (Manhattan, 1991)
 Fantasia (Blue Note, 1992)
 Paulistana (Blue Note, 1993)
 On the Classical Side (EMI Classics, 1993)
 Solos and Duets with Herbie Hancock (Blue Note, 1995)
 Impulsive! with Bob Brookmeyer & Danish Radio Jazz Orchestra (Stunt, 1997)
 The Three Americas (Blue Note, 1997)
 Eliane Elias Sings Jobim (Blue Note, 1998)
 Everything I Love (Blue Note, 2000)
 Kissed by Nature (Bluebird, 2002)
 Brazilian Classics (Blue Note, 2003)
 Dreamer (Bluebird, 2004)
 Around the City (RCA Victor, 2006)
 Something for You: Eliane Elias Sings & Plays Bill Evans (Blue Note, 2007)
 Bossa Nova Stories (Blue Note, 2008)
 Eliane Elias Plays Live (Blue Note, 2009)
 Light My Fire (Concord Picante, 2011)
 Swept Away with Marc Johnson (ECM, 2012)
 I Thought About You (Concord Jazz, 2013)
 Made in Brazil (Concord Jazz, 2015)
 Dance of Time  (Concord Jazz, 2017)
 Music from Man of La Mancha (Concord Jazz, 2018)
 Love Stories (Concord Jazz, 2019)
 Mirror Mirror with Chick Corea and Chucho Valdés (Candid, 2021)
 Quietude (Candid, 2022)

With Steps Ahead
 Steps Ahead (Elektra Musician, 1983)
 Holding Together (NYC, 2002)

As guest
 Brecker Brothers, Out of the Loop (GRP, 1994)
 Urszula Dudziak, Sorrow Is Not Forever...But Love Is (Keytone, 1983)
 Peter Erskine, Motion Poet (Denon, 1988)
 Michael Franks, Abandoned Garden (Warner Bros., 1995)
 Denyce Graves, The Lost Days (BMG, 2002)
 Joe Henderson, Double Rainbow: The Music of Antonio Carlos Jobim (Verve, 1995)
 Toninho Horta, Moonstone (Verve Forecast, 1989)
 Marc Johnson, Shades of Jade (ECM, 2005)
 Earl Klugh, Midnight in San Juan (Warner, 1991)
 Ivo Perelman, Ivo (King, 1989)
 Andy Summers, World Gone Strange (Private Music, 1991)
 Toots Thielemans, The Brasil Project (Private Music, 1992)
 Toots Thielemans, The Brasil Project Vol. 2 (Private Music, 1993)
 Ornella Vanoni, Ornella &... (CGD, 1986)

See also

List of jazz arrangers

References

External links
 – official site

Eliane Elias on Piano Jazz
 – interview, along with her husband Marc Johnson

1960 births
Living people
Brazilian jazz singers
Latin jazz pianists
Post-bop pianists
Brazilian people of Lebanese descent
Brazilian jazz pianists
Grammy Award winners
Musicians from São Paulo
Women jazz pianists
Concord Bicycle Music artists
Latin music composers
Latin Grammy Award winners
21st-century pianists
Steps Ahead members
Women in Latin music
21st-century women pianists